Roger Mendy (born 8 February 1960) is a Senegalese former professional footballer who played as a defender. He spent three years playing for AS Monaco, with whom he reached the 1992 UEFA Cup Winners' Cup Final. He previously had spells with ASC Jeanne d'Arc and Sporting Club Toulon. He finished his career in Italy with Pescara Calcio.

References
 
 

1960 births
Living people
Footballers from Dakar
Association football defenders
Senegalese footballers
Senegal international footballers
1986 African Cup of Nations players
1990 African Cup of Nations players
1992 African Cup of Nations players
ASC Jeanne d'Arc players
SC Toulon players
AS Monaco FC players
Delfino Pescara 1936 players
Ligue 1 players
Serie A players
Serie B players
Senegalese expatriate footballers
Expatriate footballers in Monaco
Expatriate footballers in Italy
Senegalese expatriate sportspeople in Italy
Senegalese expatriate sportspeople in Monaco